Misión Tacaaglé is a settlement in northern Argentina. It is located in Formosa Province.

Climate
Misión Tacaaglé has a humid subtropical climate (Köppen climate classification: Cfa) that closely borders on a tropical wet and dry climate (Aw). Summers are long, hot and humid while winters are mild and drier.

References

Populated places in Formosa Province